Blessing Akwasi Afrifah (born 26 October 2003) is an Israeli track and field athlete who specializes in the sprints. He is the 200 metres gold medallist at the World Athletics U20 Championships in 2022.

Biography
Blessing Afrifah was born and raised in Israel to parents from Ghana. His father came to Israel as an employee of the Ghanaian consulate.  He studied at Ohel Shem high school in Ramat Gan. He briefly played soccer, then turned to athletics at the age of 11. At the age of 14 he began working with national coach Igor Balon.

In 2010, he was granted permanent residence status following a government decision not to deport children of foreign workers born in Israel. At the age of 16 he appealed to Israel's Minister Aryeh Deri for Israeli citizenship. 
Afrifah is the first Israeli to run the 200 meter race in under 20 seconds.

At the 2022 World Athletics U20 Championships in Cali, Colombia, Afrifah won the 200 metre race in a photo finish with a championship record time of 19.954, just 0.006 seconds ahead of Letsile Tebogo.

See also
Sports in Israel

References

External links
 

2003 births
Living people
Israeli male sprinters
World Athletics U20 Championships winners
21st-century Israeli people
Israeli people of African descent
Sportspeople from Tel Aviv